Alinaghi Khamoushi is an Iranian business magnate and conservative politician.

An influential lobbyist in Iranian political and economic arena, he is a senior member of the Islamic Coalition Party and runs three large textile companies owned by two religious centers and the CEO of Iran Investments Company.

Khamoushi served as the president of the Iran Chamber of Commerce Industries and Mines from 1984 to 2007. He also represented Tehran, Rey, Shemiranat and Eslamshahr electoral district in the Parliament of Iran from 1992 to 1996. Khamoushi was the first head of Mostazafan Foundation, a Bonyad.

References

External linlks 
 Profile at Bloomberg.com

1939 births
Living people
Islamic Coalition Party politicians
Iranian billionaires
Iranian businesspeople
Members of the 4th Islamic Consultative Assembly
Textile engineers